Thimble Island Brewing Co. is a brewery established in 2009 by homebrewers Mike Fawcett and Justin Gargano in Branford, Connecticut, USA. Thimble Island's American Amber Ale is the company's flagship and best-selling craft beer.

See also

 Connecticut breweries
 Beer in the United States

References

External links

Privately held companies based in Connecticut
Beer brewing companies based in Connecticut